The government of Abia State is the supreme governing authority of Abia State and its local governments. It consists of the executive headed by the governor, the legislative and the judiciary.

The Executive
The Executive is an arm of the Abia State Government that oversees the daily administration of the state and the implementation of bills. The Executive is headed by the Governor of Abia State – who is allowed to appoint special advisers through the Legislative – followed by the Deputy Governor. The other offices which make up the executives are the office of the Secretary to the state government and twenty-three Commissioners.

List of ministries and their commissioners sworn in by Governor Okezie Ikpeazu in 2021

The Legislature
The Legislature or state house of assembly of the Abia State Government is the second arm of government concerned with law-making and the passing of bills. Headed by a speaker and consisting of elected members from each constituency of the state, the legislature play a key role in the appointment of state commissioners, Chief judges and other top governmental posts.

The Judiciary

The Judiciary of Abia State consists of 11 departments and also a Judicial Service Commission with statutory duties which includes the promotion and appointment of judicial staffs. It is one of the co-equal arms of the Abia State Government vested with constitutional power to interpret and make laws. It is headed by the Chief Judge of Abia State, who is appointed by the Abia State Governor through the approval of the Abia State House of Assembly.

Levels of Court

The Abia State courts consist of three levels of court which through their respective judges or magistrates perform law-related functions. The high court determines what case to hear while the other levels of court include the Customary courts, which are presided over by a Chairman and two other court judges, and the Magistrates.

Fight against COVID-19 
The state government has made it mandatory for the residents to have a free COVID-19 test as a result of the continuous increase in the number of confirmed cases in the state. The government encouraged people of the state to make themselves available for the free test to be carried out.

References

 
Abia